Mulk in Iran may refer to:
Malek Qozat
Malek Talesh